Delta Phi Kappa may refer to:

 Delta Phi Kappa (University of Southern California), a sorority at University of Southern California in Los Angeles, California; founded in 1960
 Delta Phi Kappa (LDS Church), a fraternity founded in 1920 (as the Friars) for returned missionaries of The Church of Jesus Christ of Latter-day Saints (LDS Church); which was merged in 1978 into Sigma Gamma Chi

See also
 Sigma Gamma Chi, an LDS Church fraternity founded in 1936.